The Estonian Medical Association (EMA) is a professional association of medical doctors operating in Estonia.  The association was established on 28 February 1921.

EMA also has an established Ethics committee consisting of 4 members. The ethics committee is responsible for producing guidelines on bioethics dealing with problems of medical ethics within the association.

References

External links 
 

Medical and health organizations based in Estonia
Organizations established in 1921
1921 establishments in Estonia